Mecyclothorax mahina is a species of ground beetle in the subfamily Psydrinae. It was described by Perrault in 1984.

References

mahina
Beetles described in 1984